grav wave may refer to:

 gravitational wave, a concept in general relativity, a type of gravitational radiation
 gravity wave, a concept in fluid dynamics, a type of wave oscillation
 grav-wave, a fictional concept from the Honorverse, key to several plot points